Unió Atlètica d'Horta is a football team based in Barcelona. Founded in 1923, it plays Tercera División – Group 5. Its stadium is Municipal d’Horta with a capacity of 2,500 seats.

History 
The club was founded on April 18, 1922 after the merge of Club Esportiu Autonomia and l'Athletic Baseball Club.

Season to season

 

28 seasons in Tercera División

References

External links
Official website

Football clubs in Catalonia
Football clubs in Barcelona
Association football clubs established in 1922
Divisiones Regionales de Fútbol clubs
1922 establishments in Spain